The Northwest Oregon Conference (NWOC) is a 5A level classification that falls under the Oregon School Activities Association or the OSAA. The conference was created in 2006 when the OSAA restructured its conference system, expanding from 4 levels to 6. Schools at the 5A level had previously competed at the 4A or 3A level.

Members
 Canby High School - Canby
 Centennial High School - Gresham
 Hillsboro High School - Hillsboro
 Hood River Valley High School - Hood River
 La Salle High School - Milwaukie
 Milwaukie High School - Milwaukie
 Parkrose High School - Portland
 Rex Putnam High School - Milwaukie
 Wilsonville High School - Wilsonville

External links
 nwoc5a.org

High school sports in Oregon
High school sports conferences and leagues in the United States
2006 establishments in Oregon